La Bonita: Food for the People, or simply La Bonita, is a small chain of Mexican restaurants in Portland, Oregon, United States. The family-owned business operates three locations in north (since 2011), northeast, and southeast Portland (since 2020), serving burritos, chilaquiles, tacos, tamales, and other traditional cuisine. The restaurant has a good reputation, and has been included on two Thrillist lists of the country's best burritos.

Description
La Bonita: Food for the People is a small chain of casual Mexican restaurants based in Portland. The family-owned business has fast counter service, serving burritos, chilaquiles, pozole, tacos, and tamales. Its menu also includes chicken enchiladas, horchata, quesadillas, tortas, tostadas, chimichangas, beef tongue, machaca, chile rellenos, menudo, beans, and rice. The breakfast menu includes a breakfast burrito, huevos a la mexicana, and huevos rancheros. The restaurants' interiors have a "sunny" decor, and the Alberta Street exterior has a Diego Rivera-inspired mural of a reclining woman.

History
The original restaurant opened on Alberta Street in northeast Portland's Concordia neighborhood. A second restaurant opened on Killingsworth in north Portland's Overlook neighborhood in 2011. The third restaurant opened on Division Street in southeast Portland's Hosford-Abernethy neighborhood in 2020, and has a seating capacity of 34. All three locations operated via takeout during the COVID-19 pandemic; as of May 2020, the original restaurant also offered delivery service. By April 2021, it had indoor dining, takeout, and delivery.

Reception
Thrillist's Dan Gentile included La Bonita on a 2014 list of the 16 best burritos in the United States and said: "You wouldn't think there'd be much change leftover from the proceeds of a $3 burrito, but in addition to serving some of Portland's best and cheapest Mexican, this Mom-and-Pop spot regularly donates large chunks of their proceeds to charity." Kristin Hunt included the chain on Thrillist's 2015 list of the country's 33 best burritos, writing: 

La Bonita was included in The Oregonian 2008 guide to "meals without borders", which said: "The straightforward Mexican food is a magnet to locals and wayfaring strangers. Trust the crowds: The quesadillas, chimichangas, burritos, tortas and tamales are worth knowing." The newspaper's Michael C. Zusman included the restaurant's pozole in a 2009 overview of Portland's top pork dishes. Lisa Ekman of The Oregonian wrote in 2012, "While a football-sized beef chimichanga may not represent every intricacy of Mexican regional cuisine, it is delicious, especially as prepared by friendly, informal La Bonita. If you're after tacos or tamales, be sure to order the full plate, because the beans, rice and guacamole are among the best you'll ever gorge yourself on." Michael Russell and Samantha Bakall included La Bonita on the newspaper's 2015 and 2016 lists of the city's 10 best nachos and 25 best Mexican restaurants, respectively.

Nick Zukin included La Bonita on Willamette Week 2016 list of "The Nine Best Chile Relleno Burritos in Portland" and said: "Since before hipsters 'discovered' tacos and white faces outnumbered brown ones on Alberta, this family-run taqueria decorated with murals has been serving high-quality tacos, burritos, tamales and pozole. The large chile relleno oozes a slow tidal wave of cheese and is the star of the burrito, despite too much bland rice and lettuce." In her 2019 Moon guidebook to Portland, Hollyanna McCollom wrote about the Alberta restaurant: 

During the pandemic, Brooke Jackson-Glidden included La Bonita on Eater Portland 2020 list of "Where to Find Knockout Tacos for Takeout and Delivery in Portland". Jackson-Glidden also included the Alberta restaurant in a 2021 overview of "Where to Eat and Drink on Alberta", writing: "The argument over which makes the better Alberta burrito, La Bonita or La Sirenita, is real. But La Bonita makes this list for its cheerful digs and well-priced burritos, especially the breakfast and chile relleno varieties. Plus, any burrito can arrive smothered in mole, which generally goes over exceptionally well." Nick Woo and Seiji Nanbu included La Bonita on a 2021 list of "12 Unreal Burritos in Portland" and said: "... La Bonita has become synonymous with quality fast-casual Mexican fare. The burritos here are famous for being almost as large as a newborn baby, with all the classic burrito ingredients and a short-list of proteins and veggies to choose from. While the size is the main draw here, seasoned customers know that you can also choose to make it a 'wet' burrito by smothering it in sauce or mole." Katrina Yentch included the restaurant in Eater Portland's 2022 list of "18 Knockout Spots for Affordable Dining in Portland".

See also

 Hispanics and Latinos in Portland, Oregon
 List of Mexican restaurants
 List of restaurant chains in the United States

References

External links

 
 La Bonita at Zomato

Concordia, Portland, Oregon
Hosford-Abernethy, Portland, Oregon
Mexican restaurants in Portland, Oregon
Overlook, Portland, Oregon
Restaurant chains in the United States